Alfred Fischer (born 16 February 1960) is a Swiss rower. He competed in the men's coxless pair event at the 1984 Summer Olympics.

References

External links
 
 

1960 births
Living people
Swiss male rowers
Olympic rowers of Switzerland
Rowers at the 1984 Summer Olympics
Place of birth missing (living people)